Milaq or Meylaq or Meyleq may refer to:
 Milaq, East Azerbaijan (ميلق - Mīlaq)
 Milaq, Qazvin (ميلاق - Mīlāq)